The November 2011 San Francisco general elections were held on November 8, 2011 in San Francisco, California. The elections included those for San Francisco mayor, district attorney, and sheriff, and eight ballot measures.

Mayor

District attorney
George Gascón, the former Chief of the San Francisco Police Department appointed by then-Mayor Gavin Newsom to replace Kamala Harris, ran for his first election.

Sheriff
Incumbent Sheriff Michael Hennessey did not seek reelection.

Propositions 

Note: "City" refers to the San Francisco municipal government.

Proposition A 

Proposition A would authorize the San Francisco Unified School District to issue up to $531 million in bonds, funded by a property tax increase, to modernize and repair school facilities, and create a citizens' oversight committee to monitor expenditures. This proposition required a majority of 55% to pass.

Proposition B 

Proposition B would authorize the City to issue $248 million in bonds for the repair and improvement of streets, bicycling paths, and pedestrian and traffic infrastructure. This proposition required a two-thirds majority to pass.

Proposition C 

Proposition C would adjust pension contribution rates for current and future City employees, implement limits on future pension benefits and increases, require all City employees to contribute to their retiree health care costs, among other changes to the City pension system. This was submitted to the ballot to counter Proposition D below.

Proposition D 

Proposition D would adjust pension contribution rates for current and future City employees, implement limits on future pension benefits and increases, prohibit the City from picking up the cost of employee's contributions to pension benefits, among other changes to the City pension system. This was submitted to the ballot to counter Proposition C above.

Proposition E 

Proposition E would allow ballot measures submitted by the Mayor or the Board of Supervisors on or after January 1, 2012, and subsequently approved by voters, to be amended or repealed by two-thirds of the Board three years after passage, and by a majority seven years after passage.

Proposition F 

Proposition F would decrease disclosure requirements of campaign consultants to the San Francisco Ethics Commission.

Proposition G 

Proposition G would increase the sales tax by 0.5% for a period of ten years or until the California state government instates a sales tax hike of 1% or more for at least one year. This proposition required a two-thirds majority to pass.

Proposition H 

Proposition H would make it City policy that school admissions be based primarily on the student's proximity to neighborhood schools.

References

External links
San Francisco Department of Elections

San Francisco
2011
Elections
San Francisco